Taihe ( unless otherwise noted) may refer to:

Locations in China
Taihe County, Anhui, in Fuyang, Anhui
Taihe County, Jiangxi (泰和县), in Ji'an, Jiangxi
Taihe District, Jinzhou, Liaoning
Taihe Tujia Ethnic Township, in Fengjie County, Chongqing

Subdistricts
Taihe Subdistrict, Xuyi County, in Xuyi County, Jiangsu
Taihe Subdistrict, Jinzhou, in Taihe District
Taihe Subdistrict, Shehong, in Shehong, Sichuan
Taihe Subdistrict, Kunming, in Guandu District, Kunming, Yunnan

Towns
Taihe, Hechuan District, in Hechuan District, Chongqing
Taihe, Guangzhou, in Guangzhou, Guangdong
Taihe, Qingyuan, in Qingyuan, Guangdong
Taihe, Henan, in Sheqi County, Henan
Taihe, Hubei, in Ezhou, Hubei
Taihe, Guiyang County, in Guiyang County, Hunan
Taihe, Yongxing County, in Yongxing County, Hunan
Taihe, Nanfeng County, in Nanfeng County, Jiangxi
Taihe, Heishan County, in Heishan County, Liaoning
Taihe, Shandong (太河), in Zibo, Shandong
Taihe, Linshui County, in Linshui County, Sichuan
Taihe, Meishan, in Meishan, Sichuan
Taihe, Xichang, in Xichang, Sichuan

Historical eras
Taihe (227–233), era name used by Cao Rui, emperor of Cao Wei
Taihe (328–330), era name used by Shi Le, emperor of Later Zhao
Taihe (344–346), era name used by Li Shi (emperor), emperor of Cheng Han
Taihe (366–371), era name used by Emperor Fei of Jin
Taihe (477–499), era name used by Emperor Xiaowen of Northern Wei
Taihe (泰和, 1201–1208), era name used by Emperor Zhangzong of Jin

Other topics
Princess Taihe ( 821–843), Tang dynasty princess and a Huigu Khatun by marriage
Hall of Supreme Harmony or Taihe Hall, the largest hall within the Forbidden City in Beijing
Taihe Institute, a leading Chinese think tank based in Beijing